Novorossiyskoye is a rural locality (a selo) in Yagodnovskoye Rural Settlement, Olkhovsky District, Volgograd Oblast, Russia. The population was 8 as of 2010. There are 2 streets.

Geography 
Oktyabrsky is the nearest rural locality.

References 

Rural localities in Olkhovsky District
Tsaritsynsky Uyezd